Jack Alexander Kiersey (born 26 September 1998) is an English professional footballer who plays as a midfielder most recently for Walsall.

Career
Born in Manchester, Kiersey signed for Everton at the age of 10, turning professional in May 2017. He signed for Walsall in July 2019. His contract with the club expired in January 2020, and he left the club, although he continued to train with them. In June 2020, Walsall manager Darrell Clarke said he would consider giving Kiersey another chance if he overcame injury problems.

He is eligible to represent both England and the Republic of Ireland at international level.

References

1998 births
Living people
English footballers
Association football midfielders
Everton F.C. players
Walsall F.C. players
English Football League players